Three ships of the United States Navy have been named USS Lamson in honor of Roswell Lamson.

 , was a destroyer, commissioned in 1910 and decommissioned in 1919
 , was commissioned in 1921 and decommissioned in 1930
 , was commissioned in 1936 and sunk during Operation Crossroads in 1946

United States Navy ship names